Meseguer is a surname. Notable people with the surname include:

 Álvaro Meseguer (born 1992), Spanish footballer
 Ona Meseguer (born 1988), Spanish water polo player
 Silvia Meseguer (born 1989), Spanish footballer
 Víctor Meseguer (born 1999), Spanish footballer